Richard Wilson Hawke (1865 – 12 July 1941) was a United Party Member of Parliament in New Zealand, and a farmer and poultry-breeder.

Biography

He won the Kaiapoi electorate in 1928, but was defeated in 1935.

In 1935, he was awarded the King George V Silver Jubilee Medal.

He died in Papanui, Christchurch aged 75. He was born in Cornwall, England, and had been on the Waimairi County Council.

References

1865 births
1941 deaths
United Party (New Zealand) MPs
Unsuccessful candidates in the 1935 New Zealand general election
Members of the New Zealand House of Representatives
New Zealand MPs for South Island electorates